, previously known as , is a Japanese voice actor.

Anime

TV
Combat Mecha Xabungle (Jiron Amos)
Crayon Shin-chan (Kantamu Robo, Nene's father)
Dancouga – Super Beast Machine God (Francis)
Detective Academy Q (Detective Ikematsu)
Flame of Recca (Daikoku)
Fullmetal Alchemist (the older Slicer brother)
Gyakuten! Ippatsuman (Tamashirō Nabari)
Ginga Hyōryū Vifam 13 (narration)
Idol Angel Yokoso Yoko (Toshio Harada)
Mado King Granzort (Granzort, Super Granzort)
Kimagure Orange Road (Ōtsuka-sensei)
Koroke! (Meringue)
Machine Robo: Battle Hackers (R. JeTan, Blue Jet)
Machine Robo: Revenge of Cronos (Blue Jet)
Mirai Keisatsu Urashiman (Stinger Hawk)
Mister Ajikko (Ichirō Abe, Jirō Abe)
Mobile Fighter G Gundam (Chico Rodriguez)
Mobile Suit Gundam Wing (Doktor S)
Mobile Suit Gundam ZZ (Ariasu Moma)
Mobile Suit Zeta Gundam (Mezūn Mekkusu)
Moeru! Oni-san (Police Chief, Jirō Kaibushi)
Nadia: The Secret of Blue Water (Holland)
Nintama Rantarō (Tsujiemon Rokudō)
Saber Marionette J to X (Ryūichi Watanabe)
Tekkaman Blade (General Colbert)
Weekly Story Land (You Man, Detective, Manager, Coach)

OVA
Baoh (Masked Man)
Bondage Queen Kate (Jones)
Bubblegum Crisis (Deputy Commander)
Dancougar - Super Beast Machine God: God Bless Dancougar (Francis)
Domain of Murder (Master)
The Heroic Legend of Arslan (Shapūru)
Mado King Granzort series (Granzort, Super Granzort, Hyper Granzort)
Konpeki no Kantai (Yajirō Shinagawa, Earhart Goering)
Kyokujitsu no Kantai (Earhart Goering)
Legend of the Galactic Heroes (Isaac Fernand von Turneisen)
Mobile Suit Gundam 0083: Stardust Memory (Nakaha Nakato)

Movies
Xabungle Graffiti (Jiron Amos)
Crayon Shin-chan: Adventure in Henderland (Kantamu Robo)
Crayon Shin-chan: Buri Buri 3 Minutes Charge (Kantamu Robo)
Crayon Shin-chan: Pursuit of the Dark Tama Tama (Lemon)
The Heroic Legend of Arslan (Shapūru)
Mobile Suit Gundam 0083: The Last Blitz of Zeon (Nakaha Nakato)

Games
Super Robot Wars series (Ariasu Moma, Jiron Amos, Blue Jet)

Tokusatsu
Andromeros (Andromarus (voice))

Dubbing voice-over

Live action
Yuen Biao
Winners and Sinners (CID Agent)
Twinkle, Twinkle, Lucky Stars (Fung)
Eastern Condors ("Weasel" / Chieh Man-yeh)
The 13th Warrior (Herger (Dennis Storhøi))
All the Right Moves (Greg (Gary Graham))
Blue Steel (1993 Fuji TV edition) (Howard (Matt Craven))
The Crow (Detective Torres (Marco Rodríguez))
Cyborg (VHS edition) (Marshall Strat)
Dumb and Dumber (Nicholas Andre)
Hocus Pocus (Billy Butcherson (Doug Jones))
Jacob's Ladder (1993 NTV edition) (Frank (Eriq La Salle))
JAG (CIA Special Agent Clayton Webb)
L.A. Law (Michael Cusack)
Live and Let Die
Never Say Never Again
The Time Machine (David Philby (Mark Addy))

Animation
Batman: The Animated Series (Lucas)
Courage the Cowardly Dog (Fred)
The Real Ghostbusters (Winston Zeddmore)

References

External links
 
 AllCinema Online
 Japan Movie Database

1953 births
Japanese male voice actors
Living people
Male actors from Kanagawa Prefecture
20th-century Japanese male actors
21st-century Japanese male actors